Pingqiao District is a district of the city of Xinyang, Henan province, China, bordering Hubei province to the northwest.

Administrative divisions
As 2012, this district is divided to 6 subdistricts, 5 towns and 9 townships.
Subdistricts

Towns

Townships

References

County-level divisions of Henan
Xinyang